Feather Bluster is a 1958 Warner Bros. Merrie Melodies animated short directed by Robert McKimson. The cartoon was released on May 10, 1958, and features Foghorn Leghorn and the Barnyard Dawg.

The short is essentially a clip show, in that the majority of the footage is reused from earlier cartoons.

Plot
The plot features an elderly Foghorn Leghorn and Barnyard Dawg sitting peacefully and exchanging old stories during a game of checkers. Their grandsons outside overhear their talk and imitate their old actions. The flashbacks between Foghorn and Dawg use footage from the following cartoons: (in order of appearance)
 Henhouse Henery (1949): The scene where Dawg runs into the fence that Foghorn painted to make look like an open gate, and when Foghorn runs into a mill to create a baseball bat to use against Dawg who steals it; except it has some newly-made animation the appears just after the Dawg steals the bat, showing Foghorn coming out of the workshop apparently unscathed telling the audience "That, I say, that dawg keeps a-pitchin' 'em and I keep a-duckin' 'em!", only to prove himself wrong when after briefly going back in, he falls over in a daze after coming back out. It also makes up the final clip in the cartoon, where Foghorn scares Dawg out of his dog house and proceeds to paint his tongue green.
 The High and the Flighty (1956): The scene where Foghorn gives Dawg a rigged spring bone, only in this case, not sold to Foghorn by Daffy but rather, through new animation, received by Foghorn in the mail.
 All Fowled Up (1955): The scene where Foghorn tries to blow a stick of dynamite through a tube at Dawg, but it backfires.

References

1958 films
1958 animated films
1958 short films
1950s Warner Bros. animated short films
Merrie Melodies short films
Warner Bros. Cartoons animated short films
Films directed by Robert McKimson
Films scored by Carl Stalling
Films scored by Milt Franklyn
Foghorn Leghorn films
Films about old age
Barnyard Dawg films